Dichomeris sicaellus is a moth in the family Gelechiidae. It is found in India (Himachal Pradesh).

References

Moths described in 2003
sicaellus